The Ambrosian Rite is a Latin Catholic liturgical Western Rite used in the area of Milan. The Traditional Ambrosian Rite is the form of this rite as it was used before the changes that followed the Second Vatican Council.

Nowadays the Traditional Ambrosian Rite is mainly used on Sundays and Holy Days of Obligation in the church of Santa Maria della Consolazione in Milan, using the Ambrosian Missal of 1954, as permitted by Cardinal Archbishop of Milan Carlo Maria Martini on 31 July 1985. Another celebration on Sundays and Holy Days of Obligation was authorized from 18 October 2008 onward in the town of Legnano. The Traditional Ambrosian Rite Mass may be said according to the Motu Proprio "Summorum Pontificum" thus any permissions allowing the above-mentioned Masses should be considered obsolete for such permissions from the bishop are no longer required.

The liturgical year
The liturgical year of the Ambrosian Rite begins the First Sunday of Advent, which however takes place 2 weeks earlier than in the Roman Rite, so that there are six Sundays in Advent, and the key-day of the beginning of Advent is not St. Andrew's Day (30 November) but St. Martin's Day (11 November), which begins the Sanctorale. The same is true for the Mozarabic Rite.

On the sixth Sunday of Advent the Annunciation (in Roman Rite on 25 March) is celebrated. As no fixed festivals are kept during Lent or Easter Week, it cannot be celebrated on 25 March, though it is found there in the Calendar and has an Office in the Breviary. On this Sunday there are two Masses, one of the Advent and another one of the Incarnation. This day may be compared with the Mozarabic feast of the Annunciation on 18 December.

Christmas Day has three Masses, during the night, at dawn, and during the day, as in the Roman Rite. The day after the Epiphany is the "Christophoria" (the Return from Egypt). The Sundays after the Epiphany vary, of course, in number, six being the maximum, as in the Roman Rite. The second is the Feast of the Holy Name of Jesus. Then follow Septuagesima, Sexagesima, and Quinquagesima Sundays, on which, though Gloria in Excelsis and Hallelujah are used, the vestments are violet.

There is no Ash Wednesday, and Lent begins liturgically on the first Sunday, the fast beginning on the Monday. Until the time of St. Charles Borromeo the liturgical Lent, with its use of litanies on Sundays instead of Gloria in Excelsis and the disuse of Hallelujah, began on the Monday. The title of the Sunday is Dominica in capite Quadragesimæ. The other Sundays of Lent are styled De Samaritanâ, De Abraham, De Cæco, De Lazaro, and in Ramis Palmarum or Dominica Olivarum (Palm Sunday). The names of the second to the fifth Sundays are in allusion to the subject of the Gospel of the day, not, as in the Roman Rite, to the Introit. (Cf. nomenclature of Greek Rite.) Passiontide does not begin until Holy Week. The day before Palm Sunday is Sabbatum in Traditione Symboli. This, the Blessing of the Font, the extra Masses pro Baptizatis in Ecclesiâ Hyemali on Easter Eve and every day of Easter Week, and the name of the first Sunday after Easter in albis depositis, show even more of a lingering memory of the old Easter Baptisms than the similar survivals in the Roman Rite. Holy Week is Hebdomada Authentica. Holy Thursday, Good Friday, Easter Eve, and Easter Day are named as in the Roman Rite.

The five Sundays after Easter, Ascension, Pentecost, Trinity Sunday, and Corpus Christi follow, as in the Roman Rite, but the Triduum Litaniarum (Rogation Days) comes on the Monday, Tuesday, and Wednesday after, instead of before, Ascension Day. The Sundays after Pentecost are designated as such (e.g. 3rd Sunday after Pentecost) until the Decollation of St. John (29 August). There may be as many as fifteen of them. Then follow either four or five Sundays called post Decollationem S. Joannis Baptistæ, then three Sundays of October, the third of which is the feast of the Dedication of Milan Cathedral. The rest of the Sundays until Advent are called post Dedicationem.

The Calendar of the Saints calls for little notice. There are many local saints, and several feasts which are given in the Roman Calendar in late February, March, and early April are given on other days, because of the rule against feasts in Lent. Only St. Joseph and the Annunciation come in the Lenten part of the Calendar, but the Masses of these are given on 12 December and the sixth Sunday of Advent respectively. The days are classified as follows:

 Solemnitates Domini
First Class: the Annunciation, Christmas Day, Epiphany, Easter Day with its Monday and Tuesday, Ascension Day, Pentecost, with its Monday and Tuesday, Corpus Domini, the Dedication of the Cathedral or of the local church, Solemnitas Domini titularis propriæ Ecclesiæ.
First class, secondary: the Feast of the Sacred Heart.
Second class: the Visitation, Circumcision, Purification, Transfiguration, Invention of the Cross, Trinity Sunday.
Second class, secondary: the Name of Jesus, the Holy Family, the Exaltation of the Cross. The Octaves of Christmas, Epiphany, Easter Day, Pentecost and Corpus Domini also count as Solemnitates Domini.
 Sundays
 Solemnia B. M. V. et Sanctorum
First class: the Immaculate Conception, Assumption, Nativity of St. John the Baptist, St. Joseph, Saints Peter and Paul, All Saints, the Ordination of St. Ambrose, and the Patron of the local church.
Second class: other feasts of Our Lady, St. Michael and the Archangels, and the Guardian Angels, Decollation of St. John, Feasts of Apostles and Evangelists, St. Anne, St. Charles Borromeo, the Holy Innocents, St. Joachim, St. Laurence, St. Martin, Saints Nazarius and Celsus, Saints Protasius and Gervasius, St. Stephen, St. Thomas of Canterbury.
Second class, secondary: the two Chairs of St. Peter, the Conversion of St. Paul.
 Solemnia Majora: St. Agatha, St. Agnes, St. Anthony, St. Apollinaris, St. Benedict, St. Dominic, the Translations of Saints Ambrose, Protasius, and Gervasius, St. Francis, St. Mary Magdalene, Sts. Nabor and Felix, St. Sebastian, St. Victor, St. Vincent.
 Alia Solemnia are days noted as such in the Calendar, and the days of saints whose bodies or important relics are preserved in any particular church become Solemnia for that church.
 Non-Solemnia Privilegiata
 Non-Solemnia Simplicia

Feasts are also grouped into four classes: First class of Solemnitates Domini and Solemnia; second class of the same; greater and ordinary Solemnia; non-Solemnia, divided into privilegiata and simplicia. Solemnia have two vespers, non-Solemnia only one, the first. The privilegiata have certain propria and the simplicia only the communia. The general principle of occurrences is that common to the whole Western Church. If two festivals fall on the same day, the lesser is either transferred, merely commemorated, or omitted. But the Ambrosian Rite differs materially from the Roman in the rank given to Sunday, which is only superseded by a Solemnitas Domini, and not always then, for if the Name of Jesus or the Purification falls on Septuagesima, Sexagesima, or Quinquagesima Sunday, it is transferred, though the distribution and procession of candles takes place on the Sunday on which the Purification actually falls. If a Solemne Sanctorum or a privileged non-Solemne falls on a Sunday, a Solemnitas Domini, the Friday or Saturday of the fourth or fifth week of Advent, a Feria de Exceptato, within an Octave of a great Feast, a Feria Litaniarum, or a Feria of Lent, the whole office is of the Sunday, Solemnitas Domini, etc., and the Solemne or non-Solemne privilegiatum is transferred, in most cases to the next clear day, but in the case of Solemnia of the first or second class to the next Feria, quocumque festo etiam solemni impedita. A simple non-Solemne is never transferred, but it is omitted altogether if a Solemne of the first class falls on the same day, and in other cases of occurrences it is commemorated, though of course it supersedes an ordinary Feria. The concurrences of the first Vespers of one feast with the second of another are arranged on much the same principle, the chief peculiarity being that if a Solemne Sanctorum falls on a Monday its first Vespers is kept not on the Sunday, but on the preceding Saturday, except in Advent, when this rule applies only to Solemnia of the first and second class, and other Solemnia are only commemorated at Sunday Vespers. The liturgical colours of the Ambrosian Rite are very similar to those of the Roman, the most important differences being that (except when some greater day occurs) red is used on the Sundays and Feriæ after Pentecost and the Decollation of St. John until the Eve of the Dedication (third Sunday in October), on Corpus Christi and its Octave, and during Holy Week, except on Good Friday, as well as on the days on which it is used in the Roman Rite, and that (with similar exceptions) green is only used from the Octave of the Epiphany to the eve of Septuagesima, from Low Sunday to the Friday before Pentecost, after the Dedication to Advent, and on feasts of abbots.

The Divine Office

The distribution of the Psalter 

The Ambrosian distribution of the Psalter is partly fortnightly and partly weekly. Psalms 1 to 108 are divided into ten decuriæ, one of which, in its numerical order, divided into three Nocturns, is recited at Matins on the Mondays, Tuesdays, Wednesdays, Thursdays, and Fridays of each fortnight, each Nocturn being said under one antiphon. At the Matins of Sunday and Solemnitates Domini and on Feriæ in Easter and Pentecost weeks and the octave of Corpus Christi, there are no psalms, but three Old Testament canticles, Isaias 26, De nocte vigilatâ; the Canticle of Anna (1 Kings 2), Confirmatum est; and the Canticle of Jonas, Clamavi ad Dominum, or of Habacuc, Domine audivi. And on Saturdays the Canticle of Moses (Exod. 15), Cantemus Domino, and half of Psalm 118 take the place of Decuriæ at the three Nocturns.

At Vespers, Psalms 109 to 147, except 117, 118, and 133, which are used elsewhere, and 142, which is only used in the Office of the Dead and as Psalmus Directus at Lauds on Fridays, are divided between the whole seven days of each week in their numerical sequence, and in the same manner as in the Roman Rite.

Psalm 118, besides being used on Saturdays, is distributed among the four lesser Hours exactly as in the Roman Rite; Psalm 50 is said at Lauds every day except Sunday, when the Benedicite takes its place, and Saturday, when Psalm 117, takes its place, and with the Preces (when these are used) at Prime and Terce throughout the year and at None during Lent, while at the Preces of Sext Psalm 53 is said, and at those of None Psalm 85, except during Lent. Psalm 53 precedes Beati immaculati at Prime, and Psalms 4, 30, V. 1-6, 90 and 133 are said daily, as in the Roman Rite, at Compline.

At Lauds a single Psalm, known as Psalmus Directus, differing with the day of the week, is also said.

TABLE OF DECURIÆ 

During Lent Psalm 90 is said as Psalmus Directus at Vespers, except on Sundays, Fridays, and Saturdays, and the "Four Verses of a Psalm" at Lauds on Saturdays are alternately from the twelfth and first parts of Ps. 118, and on the six Sundays the "Four Verses" are from 69, 101, 62, 58. During Lent also the Vesper "Four Verses" are different for every day, except that there are none on Friday, and those on the first four Saturdays are from Ps. 91. In Holy Week the Psalms at the Nocturns and at Vespers are all proper, and there are also proper Psalms during the period from the first Feria de Exceptato until the Circumcision; and on the Annunciation (sixth Sunday of Advent), Epiphany, Christophoria, Name of Jesus, Ascension, Corpus Christi, the Dedication and many Solemnia Sanctorum, and on many other saints' days the Decuriœ are superseded by Psalms of the common (liturgy) Common of Saints.

Other details of the Divine Office 

Antiphonœ, similar in construction to those in the Roman Rite are: in Psalmis et canticis, used as in the Roman Rite; in Choro, said after the Lucernarium on Sundays, at the second Vespers of Solemnia, or on other saints' days, at first Vespers, but not on Feriœ, except Saturdays in Advent; ad Crucem, said on Solemnitates Domini, on Sundays, except in Lent, and on Solemnia. Responsoria are constructed as in the Roman Rite, and are: Post hymnum, said after the hymn at Matins; Inter lectiones at Matins; cum Infantibus or cum Pueris after the hymn at the first Vespers of Solemnia; in Choro, said at Vespers on Sundays, at the second Vespers of Solemnia, and at the first of Non-Solemnia, after the hymn; in Baptisterio, at Lauds and Vespers of some Solemnitates after the first Psallenda, on Feriœ after the twelve Kyries, at Vespers after the prayer which follows Magnificat; Diaconalia or Quadragesimalia, on Wednesdays in Lent and on Good Friday; ad Cornu Altaris, at Lauds before the Psalmus Directus on Christmas Day, the Epiphany, and Easter Eve; Gradualia, said after the hymn at Lauds on Feriœ in Lent. Lucernaria are Responsoria which begin Vespers. Psallendœ are single verses, often from the Psalms, said after the twelve Kyries and the second prayer at Lauds, and after the prayers at Vespers. They are variable according to the day, and are followed by either one or two fixed Complenda or Completoria, which are also single verses. Psalmi Directi are said at Lauds and sometimes at Vespers. They are sung together by both choirs, not antiphonally. Psalmi Quatuor Versus is the name given to four verses of a psalm said at Vespers and Lauds on weekdays, after one of the Collects. Among the Hymns, besides those by St. Ambrose, or commonly attributed to him, many are included by other authors, such as Prudentius, Venantius Fortunatus, St. Gregory, St. Thomas Aquinas, and many whose authorship is unknown. A considerable number of well-known hymns (e. g. "Ave Maris Stella", "A Solis Ortus Cardine", "Jesu Redemptor Omnium," "Iste confessor") are not in the Ambrosian Hymnal, but there are many there which are not in the Roman, and those that are common to both generally appear as they were before the revisions of Urban VIII, though some have variants of their own. Capitula are short lessons of Scripture used as in the Roman Rite. At the Lesser Hours and Compline Capitula taken from the Epistles are called Epistolellœ.

Construction of the Divine Office 

(The constantly occurring Dominus vobiscum, etc., has been omitted in this analysis.) 
 Matins: Pater noster; Ave Maria; Deus in adjutorium; Gloria Patri; Hallelujah or Laus tibi. (The Ambrosians transliterate Hallelujah from Hebrew, not from Greek. They also write caelum not coelum and seculum not saeculum.) Hymn; Responsorium; canticle, Benedictus es (Dan. iii); Kyrie eleison, thrice Psalms or Canticles of the three Nocturns; Lessons, with Responsoria and Benedictions — usually three Lessons, Sundays, homilies; weekdays from the Bible; saints' days, Bible and life of saint. On Christmas Day and Epiphany nine lessons; on Good Friday, six; on Easter Eve, none. On Sundays and festivals, except in Lent and Advent, Te Deum follows.
 Lauds: Introduction as at Matins; canticle, Benedictus, Attende cœlum or Clamavi; Kyrie, thrice; Antiphona ad Crucem, repeated five or seven times, not said on Feriœ; Oratio secreta i; canticle, Cantemus Domino (Ex. xv); Kyrie, thrice; Oratio secreta ii; canticle, Benedicite, Confitemini Domino (Ps. cxvii), or Miserere (Ps. l); Kyrie, thrice; Oratio i; psalms, Laudate (Pss. cxlviii-cl, cxvi); Capitulum; Kyrie, thrice. Psalmus Directus; hymn (on weekdays in Lent, Graduale); Kyrie, twelve times. On Sundays and festivals, Psallenda and Completorium; on Feriœ, Responsorium in Baptisterio; Kyrie, thrice; Oratio ii. On Sundays and Solemnitates Domini, Psallenda ii and Completorium ii; on weekdays Psalmi iv, versus and Completorium; Kyrie, thrice; Oratio iii; commemorations, if any; concluding versicles and responses.
 Little Hours (Prime, Terce, Sext, None): Introduction as at Matins. Hymn; psalms; Epistolella; Responsorium Breve (at Prime, Quicunque vult); Capitulum; Preces (when said); at Prime, three Orationes, at other Hours, one; Kyrie, thrice; Benedicamus Domino, etc. (at Prime in choir the Martyrology, followed by Exultabunt Sancti etc., and a prayer); Fidelium animœ etc.
 Vespers: Introduction as at Matins. On Sundays and Feriœ: Lucernarium; (on Sundays, Antiphona in choro); hymn; Responsorium in choro; five psalms; Kyrie, thrice; Oratio i; Magnificat; Oratio ii; on Sundays, Psallenda i, and two Completoria; on Feriœ, Responsorium in Baptisterio; Kyrie, thrice; Oratio iii; on Sundays, Psallenda ii, and two Completoria; on Feriœ, Psalmi iv versus; Kyrie, thrice; Oratio iv; commemorations, if any. On saints' days; Lucernarium; at second vespers Antiphona in choro; hymn; Responsorium in choro or cum infantibus; psalm; Kyrie, thrice; Oratio i; Psalm; Oratio ii; Magnificat; Kyrie, thrice; Oratio iii; Psallenda and two Completoria; Kyrie, thrice; Oratio iv; commemorations. Concluding versicles and responses.
 Compline: Introduction, with addition of Converte nos, etc.; hymn (Te Lucis); Psalms iv, xxx, 1-7, xc, cxxxii, cxxxiii, cxvi; Epistolella; Responsorium; Nunc Dimittis; Capitulum; Kyrie, thrice; Preces (when said); Oratio i, Oratio ii; concluding versicles and responses; Antiphon of Our Lady; Confiteor. There are antiphons to all psalms, except those of Compline, and to all canticles. During Lent, except on Saturdays and Sundays, there are two lessons (from Genesis and Proverbs) after Terce; and on Wednesdays and Fridays of Lent and on Feriœ de Exceptato litanies are said then.

The Mass
The Ambrosian Mass in its present form is best shown by an analysis pointing out the differences from the Tridentine Mass. As a great part of it agrees word for word with the Roman, it will only be necessary to indicate the agreements, without giving the passages in full. There are a certain number of ceremonial differences, the most noticeable of which are: 
 When the deacon and sub-deacon are not occupied, they take up positions at the north and south ends of the altar facing each other.
 The Prophecy, Epistle, and Gospel are read, in Milan Cathedral, from the great ambon on the north side of the choir, and the procession thereto is accompanied with some state.
 The offering of bread and wine by the men and women of the Scuola di S. Ambrogio.
 The filing past and kissing the north corner of the altar at the Offertory.
 The silent Lavabo just before the Consecration.
 The absence of bell-ringing at the Elevation.

In the rubrics of the Missal there are certain survivals of ancient usage which could only have applied to the city of Milan itself, and may be compared with the "stations" affixed to certain Masses in the Roman Missal of to-day. The Ambrosian Rite supposes the existence of two cathedrals, the Basilica Major or Ecclesia Æstiva] ("summer church"), and the Basilica Minor or Ecclesia Hiemalis ("winter church"). Lejay, following Giulini, calls the Ecclesia Major (St. Mary's) the winter church, and St. Thecla the summer church (Cabrol, Dictionnaire d'archéologie chrétienne, col. 1382 sqq.), but Ecclesia Hiematis and Ecclesia Major in the "Bergamo Missal", and Ecclesia Hiemalis and Ad Sanctam Mariam, in all missals, are evidently contrasted with one another. Also the will of Berengarius I, founding St. Rafaele (quoted by Giulini, I, 416) speaks of the latter being near the summer church, which it is, if the summer church is St. Mary's. There is also assumed to be a detached baptistery and a Chapel of the Cross, though mentions of these are found chiefly in the Breviary, and in earlier times the church of St. Laurence was the starting point of the Palm Sunday ceremonies. The greater, or summer, church, under the patronage of Our Lady, is now the Cathedral; the lesser, or winter, church, which stood at the opposite end of the Piazza del Duomo, and was destroyed in 1543, was under the patronage of St. Thecla. As late as the time of Beroldus (twelfth century) the changes from one to the other were made at Easter and at the Dedication of the Great Church (third Sunday in October), and even now the rubric continues to order two Masses on certain great days, one in each church, and on Easter Eve and through Easter week one Mass is ordered daily pro baptizatis in Ecclesia Hiemali, and another, according to the Bergamo book, in Ecclesia Majori. The modern books say  in omni ecclesiâ. There were two baptisteries, both near the greater church.

The Occasional Services 
Of the services in the Ritual and Pontifical there is not much to say. The ceremonies of Baptism differ in their order from those of the Roman Rite. The Ambrosian order is: renunciation; ephphatha; sufflation; unction; exorcism and second sufflation; signing with the Cross; delivery of the salt; introduction into the church; Creed and Lord's Prayer; declaration of faith; Baptism, for which the rubric is: Ter occiput mergit in aqua in crucis formam (and, as Legg points out, the Ambrosians boast that their baptism is always by immersion); litany; anointing with chrism; delivery of white robe and candle; dismissal. A great part of the wording is exactly the same as the Roman.

The order of the Unction of the Sick shows the progress of Roman influence in modern times. The service at present used differs very little except at one point from that given by Magistretti (Mon. Vet., II, 79, 94, 147) from early Manuscripts, and from the form in the undated printed Ritual of the late fifteenth century, but the difference at that point is no less than the introduction of the Roman manner and words of anointing. The old Ambrosian Rite was to anoint the sick person on the breast, the hands, and the feet, with the words: "Ungo te oleo sanctificato, more militis unctus et preparatus ad luctam aerias possis catervas. Operare creatura olei, in nomine+Dei Patris omnipotentis+et Filii+et Spiritus Sancti, ut non lateat spiritus immundus nec in membris nec in medullis nec in ulla compagine membrorum hujus hominis [vel mulieris] sed operetur in eo virtus Christi Filii Altissimi qui cum æterno Patri... . Amen." Then, "Quidquid peccasti per cogitationem cordis [per operationem manuum vel per ingressum pedum] parcat tibi Deus. Amen." The fifteenth-century printed Ritual varies the first anointing. Instead of "Quidquid peccasti", it reads, "Per istam unctionem et cristi sacratissimam passionem si quid peccasti, etc.", the other two being as in the older books. The Ungo te, etc., is repeated with each. A somewhat similar form, but shorter, with the anointing of the five senses and reading Ungimus for Ungo, is given in Harl. Manuscript 2990, an early fifteenth-century North Italian fragment, and in the Venetian printed pre-Tridontine Rituals, a form very like the last (but reading Ungo) with the same anointings as in the Roman Rite, is given as the rite of the Patriarchate of Venice. This form, or something very like it, with the seven anointings is found in the Asti Ritual described by Gastoué. In the modern Ambrosian Ritual the Roman seven anointings and the form, Per istam unctionem, etc., are taken over bodily and the Ungo te has disappeared.

The differences in the Order of Matrimony are very slight, and the other contents of the Ritual call for no special remark. In the ninth-century Pontifical published by Magistretti the consecration of a church includes the solemn entry, the writing of the ABCturium, with the cambutta (that Gaelic word, cam bata, crooked staff, which is commonly used in Gallican books), the blessing and mixture of salt, water, ashes, and wine, the sprinkling and anointing of the church and the altar, the blessing of various utensils, and at the end the deposition of the relics. The order given by Mercati from an eleventh-century Manuscript at Lucca differs from the ninth-century form in that there is a circumambulation and sprinkling, with the signing of the cross on the door, the writing of an alphabet per parietem and the making of three crosses on each wall with chrism, before the entry, and there is no deposition of relics. There are also considerable differences of wording. The ordinations in the ninth-century Manuscript are of the same mixed Roman and Gallican type, but are less developed than those of the modern Roman Pontifical.

See also
Ambrosian Rite
Ambrosian chant
Ambrosians
St. Ambrose
Catholic Liturgical Rites
Roman Catholic Archdiocese of Milan

Notes

Sources

External links 
The Ordinary of the pre-conciliar Ambrosian Mass in English
Ordinary of the pre-conciliar Ambrosian Mass in Latin
Breviarium Ambrosianum
https://archive.org/details/ambrosianliturgy00cathuoft

Latin liturgical rites
Traditionalist Catholicism